Darrel Duane Knibbs aka "The Nibbler" aka "The Scrib Nibbler" (born September 21, 1949) is a Canadian former professional ice hockey player. He was selected by the Montreal Canadiens in the 10th round (84th overall) of the 1969 NHL Amateur Draft.

Knibbs played 41 games in the World Hockey Association with the 1972-73 Chicago Cougars.

References

External links

1949 births
Canadian ice hockey centres
Chicago Cougars players
EC Red Bull Salzburg players
Ice hockey people from Alberta
Lethbridge Sugar Kings players
Living people
Montreal Canadiens draft picks
Muskegon Mohawks players
Rhode Island Eagles players
Sportspeople from Medicine Hat
Suncoast Suns (SHL) players
Canadian expatriate ice hockey players in Austria